Dan Goldie and Rick Leach were the defending champions but did not compete that year.

Peter Doohan and Laurie Warder won in the final 3–6, 6–2, 6–3 against Rill Baxter and Glenn Michibata.

Seeds
Champion seeds are indicated in bold text while text in italics indicates the round in which those seeds were eliminated.

 Peter Doohan /  Laurie Warder (champions)
 Horacio de la Peña /  Kelly Evernden (first round)
 João Cunha e Silva /  Danilo Marcelino (first round)
 Tim Pawsat /  Tobias Svantesson (semifinals)

Draw

External links
 1989 BP National Championships Doubles draw

BP National Championships
1989 Grand Prix (tennis)